Rogers v. Bellei, 401 U.S. 815 (1971), was a decision by the United States Supreme Court, which held that an individual who received an automatic congressional grant of citizenship at birth, but who was born outside the United States, may lose his citizenship for failure to fulfill any reasonable residence requirements which the United States Congress may impose as a condition subsequent to that citizenship.

The case
The appellee, Aldo Mario Bellei, was born in Italy to an Italian father and an American mother. He acquired U.S. citizenship by virtue of section 1993 of the Revised Statutes of 1874, which conferred citizenship upon any child born outside the United States of only one American parent (known as jus sanguinis). Bellei received several warnings from government officials that failure to fulfill the five-year residency requirement before age 28 could result in loss of his U.S. citizenship. In 1964, he received a letter informing him that his citizenship had been revoked under § 301(b) of the Immigration and Nationality Act of 1952. 

Bellei challenged the constitutionality of this act. The three-judge District Court held the section unconstitutional, citing Afroyim v. Rusk, and Schneider v. Rusk. 

The Supreme Court reversed the decision, ruling against Bellei.

Later
The statute under which Bellei was stripped of his citizenship was repealed by the U.S. Congress in 1978.

See also
List of United States Supreme Court cases, volume 401
Afroyim v. Rusk,

References

Further reading
.
.
.

External links
 

1971 in United States case law
United States Supreme Court cases
United States Supreme Court cases of the Burger Court
United States immigration and naturalization case law
History of immigration to the United States